Lindequesdrif is an area comprising agricultural holdings, lying between Vanderbijlpark and Potchefstroom, in the far eastern corner of North West province in South Africa.

It lies on the northern banks of the Vaal River near Sasolburg on the border with the Free State.

References

Populated places in the JB Marks Local Municipality